Joseph Daniel Patrick Maguire (born 18 January 1996) is an English professional footballer who plays as a left-back, most recently for Tranmere Rovers. He has played in the English Football League for Fleetwood Town and Crawley Town. He will become a free agent on 30 June 2022.

Career

Liverpool
Maguire was born in Manchester, Greater Manchester. joined the Liverpool academy at under-nine level, coming from Swinton Boys. After progressing through the academy ranks he travelled with the Liverpool first team on their 2015 pre-season tour and made a number of appearances in friendly matches. Maguire joined League Two club Leyton Orient on 28 August 2015 on a one-month loan deal. He made his first-team debut four days later on 1 September, playing 90 minutes for Leyton Orient in a 2–1 Football League Trophy loss away to Luton Town.

On 8 January 2016, he was named in the Liverpool first-team as a substitute in an FA Cup third-round match away to Exeter City. He was subsequently brought on in the 76th minute to make his Liverpool debut, with the match finishing a 2–2 draw.

Fleetwood Town
Maguire signed for League One club Fleetwood Town on 13 January 2017 on a two-and-a-half-year contract.

He joined League Two club Crawley Town on 31 August 2018 on loan until 1 January 2019. On 3 January 2019, Maguire extended his loan until the end of the 2018–19 season.

Accrington Stanley
Maguire signed for League One club Accrington Stanley on 15 July 2019 on a one-year contract with the option of a further year. On 14 May 2021 Maguire was released.

Tranmere Rovers F.C.
On 6 July 2021, Maguire joined League Two side Tranmere Rovers on a one-year deal. He was released by the club at the end of his contract.

Career statistics

References

External links
Profile at the Accrington Stanley F.C. website

1996 births
Living people
Footballers from Manchester
English footballers
Association football defenders
Liverpool F.C. players
Leyton Orient F.C. players
Fleetwood Town F.C. players
Crawley Town F.C. players
Accrington Stanley F.C. players
English Football League players
Tranmere Rovers F.C. players